The Deputy Drummer is a 1935 British musical film directed by Lupino Lane and starring Lane, Jean Denis and Kathleen Kelly.

The film was based on a stage musical. It was shot at Wembley Studios as a quota quickie for release by the American company Columbia Pictures. The film's sets were designed by the art director Andrew Mazzei.

Synopsis
Drummer and aspiring composer Adolphus Miggs is fired by his exasperated bandleader. A talent agent secures him a job as a drummer at a society party, unaware that his former band have also been hired. To add to the confusion he masquerades as an aristocrat of the same name. Fortunately in the process he manages to foil some jewel thieves.

Reception
In summing up the film, the magazine Picturegoer concluded that "Lupino Lane's dances are its only asset".

Cast
 Lupino Lane as Adolphus Miggs 
 Jean Denis as Bubbles O'Hara 
 Kathleen Kelly as Peggy Sylvester 
 Wallace Lupino as Robbins 
 Margaret Yarde as Lady Sylvester 
 Arthur Rigby as Sir Henry Sylvester 
 Syd Crossley as Curtis 
 Reginald Long as Captain Hindlemarsh 
 Fred Leslie as Kabitzer 
 Hal Gordon as Yokel 
 Harold Brewer as Baritz 
 Arthur Clayton as Sir Arthur Paterson

References

Bibliography
 Chibnall, Steve. Quota Quickies: The Birth of the British 'B' Film. British Film Institute, 2007.
 Dutton, Julian. Keeping Quiet: Visual Comedy in the Age of Sound. Chaplin Books, 2015.
 Low, Rachael. Filmmaking in 1930s Britain. George Allen & Unwin, 1985.
 Wood, Linda. British Films, 1927-1939. British Film Institute, 1986.

External links

1935 films
British musical comedy films
1935 musical comedy films
British films based on plays
Films directed by Lupino Lane
Films set in London
Quota quickies
Films shot at Wembley Studios
Columbia Pictures films
British black-and-white films
1930s English-language films
1930s British films